Black Myth/Out in Space is a 2CD live album by American composer, bandleader and keyboardist Sun Ra recorded in 1970 in Donaueschingen and Berlin and released on the Motor Music label in 1998. Selections from the concerts were originally released in 1970 on MPS Records as It's After the End of the World but the rerelease complies both complete concerts adding more than 75 minutes of previously unissued recordings.

Reception

In a review for Allmusic, Jason Ankeny states, "this two-disc set is far and away the definitive release of the material in question, compiling two 1970 festival appearances documenting Sun Ra at the peak of his considerable creative powers".

Track listing
All compositions by Sun Ra

Disc One:
 "Black Forest Myth" – 3:58
 "Friendly Galaxy No. 2" – 5:25
 "Journey Through the Outer Darkness" – 12:58 previously unreleased
 "Strange Worlds/Black Myth/It's After the End of the World" – 15:18 	
 "We'll Wait for You" – 10:13 previously unreleased
Recorded at the Stadthalle as part of the Donaueschingen Musik Festival on October 17, 1970
Disc Two:
 "Out in Space" – 37:45 previously unreleased
 "Discipline Series" – 3:28 previously unreleased
 "Walkin' on the Moon..." – 9:02 previously unreleased
 "Outer Space Where I Came From" [recitation] – 0:23 previously unreleased
 "Watusa" – 2:44 	
 "Myth Versus Reality" – 14:59
 "Theme of the Stargazers" – 0:42 previously unreleased
 "Space Chants Medley: Second Stop Is Jupiter/Why Go to the Moon/Neptune" – 5:42 previously unreleased
 "We Travel the Spaceways" – 3:02 previously unreleased  
Recorded at the Kongresshalle as part of the Berlin Jazz Festival on November 7, 1970.

Personnel
Sun Ra – Farfisa organ, Hohner clavinet, piano, Rocksichord, Spacemaster organ, Minimoog, Hohner electra, vocals
Kwame Hadi – trumpet
Akh Tal Ebah – mellophone, trumpet
John Gilmore – tenor saxophone, percussion
Marshall Allen – alto saxophone, flute, oboe, piccolo, percussion
Pat Patrick – baritone saxophone, tenor saxophone, alto saxophone, clarinet, bass clarinet, flute, drum
Danny Davis – alto saxophone, flute, clarinet
Abshalom Ben Shlomo – alto saxophone, flute, clarinet
Danny Ray Thompson – baritone saxophone, alto saxophone, flute
Leroy Taylor – oboe, bass clarinet
Robert Cummings – bass clarinet
Augustus Browning – English horn
Alan Silva – violin, viola, cello, bass
Alejandro Blake Fearon – bass
Lex Humphries – drums
James Jackson – percussion, oboe, flute
Nimrod Hunt – hand drums
Hazoume – fireeater, dance, African percussion
Math Samba, Ife Tayo – dance, percussion
June Tyson – vocals 
Richard Wilkinson – stereo light-sound coordination

References

1998 live albums
Sun Ra live albums